The 2019 Toronto Blue Jays season was the 43rd season of the Toronto Blue Jays franchise, and the Blue Jays' 29th full season (30th overall) at Rogers Centre. The Blue Jays were managed by Charlie Montoyo in his first year as the Blue Jays manager. The Blue Jays began their season at home against the Detroit Tigers on March 28 and ended their season at home against the Tampa Bay Rays on Sunday, September 29. They finished with a record of 67-95, a worse record than the previous season, and failed to qualify for the postseason for the third consecutive year.

Offseason

On September 26, 2018, it was announced that John Gibbons would not return to manage the Blue Jays for the 2019 season.

October 2018 
On October 25, the Blue Jays hired Charlie Montoyo as their new manager.
On October 29, RHP Marco Estrada and RHP Tyler Clippard elected free agency.
On October 31, the Blue Jays exercised their $8 million club option on Justin Smoak, and declined their $5.5 million club option on Yangervis Solarte.

November 2018 
On November 2, the Blue Jays outrighted Justin Shafer to Triple-A. Rhiner Cruz, Taylor Guerrieri, and Jake Petricka cleared waivers and became free agents. José Fernández was claimed off waivers by the Detroit Tigers.
On November 3, the Blue Jays fired hitting coach Brook Jacoby and first base coach Tim Leiper.
On November 7, the Blue Jays hired Dave Hudgens as their bench coach, replacing DeMarlo Hale.
On November 15, the Blue Jays hired Guillermo Martinez as their new hitting coach.
On November 17, the Blue Jays traded INF Aledmys Díaz to the Houston Astros for P Trent Thornton.
On November 20, the Blue Jays selected the contracts of Héctor Pérez, Trent Thornton, Patrick Murphy, Yennsy Díaz, and Jacob Waguespack.
On November 26, the Blue Jays claimed Oliver Drake off waivers from the Tampa Bay Rays, and designated Mark Leiter Jr. for assignment.
On November 26, the Blue Jays hired Matt Buschmann as their new bullpen coach, Mark Budzinski as their new first base coach, and Shelley Duncan as their major league field co-ordinator.
On November 27, the Blue Jays named John Schneider their Major League coach, and announced that Mike Mordecai would not be returning as the team's quality control coach.
On November 30, the Blue Jays non-tendered Yangervis Solarte, who became a free agent.

December 2018 
On December 11, the Blue Jays released Troy Tulowitzki.
On December 13, the Blue Jays selected Elvis Luciano in the Rule 5 draft, but lost Jordan Romano and Travis Bergen in the same draft to the Chicago White Sox and the San Francisco Giants, respectively.
On December 28, the Blue Jays signed Matt Shoemaker to a 1-year, $3.5 million contract.
On December 30, the Blue Jays acquired Clayton Richard from the San Diego Padres in exchange for minor leaguer Connor Panas. Oliver Drake was designated for assignment.

January 2019 
On January 4, the Blue Jays traded Oliver Drake to the Tampa Bay Rays for cash considerations.
On January 11, the Blue Jays sent Russell Martin along with $16.4 million to the Los Angeles Dodgers for minor leaguers Ronny Brito and Andrew Sopko.
On January 11, the Blue Jays avoided arbitration and agreed to one-year contracts with Marcus Stroman ($7.4 million), Aaron Sanchez ($3.9 million), Kevin Pillar ($5.8 million), Randal Grichuk ($5 million), Joe Biagini ($900,000), Ken Giles ($6.3 million), Devon Travis ($1.925 million), and Brandon Drury ($1.3 million).
On January 12, the Blue Jays signed David Phelps to a 1-year, $2.5 million contract.
On January 29, the Blue Jays signed Freddy Galvis to a 1-year, $4 million contract with a club option for 2020. Danny Barnes was designated for assignment.

Spring training
On March 25 and 26, the Blue Jays returned to Montreal's Olympic Stadium for two games against the Milwaukee Brewers.

Standings

American League East

American League Wild Card

Records vs opponents

2019 draft

Regular season

Opening Day

March and April

On opening day, Detroit Tigers starting pitcher Jordan Zimmermann pitched a perfect game through 6 2/3 innings against the Blue Jays before giving up a hit to Teoscar Hernández. Marcus Stroman also pitched seven scoreless innings for the Blue Jays. Toronto lost the contest 2–0 in 11 innings, after Christin Stewart hit a two-run homer in the 10th inning. On April 1, Baltimore Orioles starting pitcher David Hess pitched a no-hitter through 6 1/3 innings before manager Brandon Hyde took him out of the game, in a game the Blue Jays wound up losing 6–5. On April 4, in the first game of a four-game set against the Cleveland Indians at Progressive Field, starter Trevor Bauer pitched seven innings of no-hit ball against the Blue Jays before being removed from the game after throwing 117 pitches, as the Blue Jays lost 4-1. In the final game of the series, Indians pitcher Mike Clevinger pitched five innings, while giving up one hit and striking out 10 Blue Jays batters in a 3–1 Cleveland win. The Blue Jays managed only 19 hits while tallying 57 strikeouts in the series, the second most in franchise history, while striking out at least 13 times in four consecutive games for the first time in franchise history and only fourth time in MLB history.

May
The Blue Jays were swept by the Minnesota Twins in a series at home from May 6 to May 8 as they were shutout in back-to-back games, before Billy McKinney's solo home run in the final game of the series ended a 25-inning scoreless skid for the team. The team had their worst month of the year in May, finishing with a 7–21 record while losing four straight games or more on three separate occasions.

June
On June 2, the Colorado Rockies finished off a three-game sweep of the Blue Jays at Coors Field. From June 7 to June 9, another national league team, the Arizona Diamondbacks, swept the Blue Jays at the Rogers Centre in a series where Toronto only managed to score four runs. In a game at Yankee Stadium against the Blue Jays on June 25, the New York Yankees set a new MLB team record by hitting a home run for the 28th consecutive game, with DJ LeMahieu hitting the record-setting home run in the first inning in a 4–3 win.

July
On July 24, Shane Bieber of the Cleveland Indians tossed a complete game one hitter against the Blue Jays, striking out ten batters and walking one as the Indians won 4–0, taking two of three games from the Jays.

August
On August 8, rookie Bo Bichette set a new MLB record for most consecutive doubles to start a career with nine when he doubled in the bottom of the sixth inning against the New York Yankees. On August 11, Masahiro Tanaka of the New York Yankees pitched eight innings against the Blue Jays while giving up only three hits in a 1–0 win that split a four-game set between the two teams. Aroldis Chapman came in the 9th inning to close the game for the Yankees, inducing a double play from the bat of Vladimir Guerrero Jr. following a 13-pitch at-bat, for which the rookie received a standing ovation from the crowd at Rogers Centre. In their game against the Texas Rangers on August 12, the Blue Jays set a franchise record with 13 extra-base hits. On August 18, Yusei Kikuchi of the Seattle Mariners pitched a complete game two-hit shutout against the Blue Jays in a 7–0 win as the Mariners took two of three games from the Blue Jays.

September
On September 1, Justin Verlander of the Houston Astros pitched a no-hitter against the Blue Jays, the third of his career (and second against Toronto) in a 2–0 win.

Game log

|-  style="text-align:center; background:#fbb;"
| 1 || March 28 || Tigers || 0–2 (10) || Alcántara (1–0) || Hudson (0–1) || Greene (1) || 45,048 || 0–1 || 1 
|-  style="text-align:center; background:#bfb;"
| 2 || March 29 || Tigers || 6–0 || Shoemaker (1–0) || Boyd (0–1) || — || 18,054 || 1–1 || ½
|-  style="text-align:center; background:#bfb;"
| 3 || March 30 || Tigers || 3–0 || Sanchez (1–0) || Turnbull (0–1) || Giles (1) || 25,429 || 2–1 || –
|-  style="text-align:center; background:#fbb;"
| 4 || March 31 || Tigers || 3–4 (11) || Stumpf (1–0) || Pannone (0–1) || Greene (2) || 16,098 || 2–2 || 1
|-

|-  style="text-align:center; background:#fbb;"
| 5 || April 1 || Orioles || 5–6 || Hess (1–0) || Reid-Foley (0–1) || Bleier (1) || 10,460 || 2–3 || 2
|-  style="text-align:center; background:#fbb;"
| 6 || April 2 || Orioles || 1–2 || Cashner (1–1) || Stroman (0–1) || Castro (1) || 12,110 || 2–4 || 3
|-  style="text-align:center; background:#bfb;"
| 7 || April 3 || Orioles || 5–3 || Shoemaker (2–0) || Karns (0–1) || Giles (2) || 11,436 || 3–4 || 2
|-  style="text-align:center; background:#fbb;"
| 8 || April 4 || @ Indians || 1–4 || Bauer (1–0) || Sanchez (0–1) || Hand (3) || 10,375 || 3–5 || 2½
|-  style="text-align:center; background:#fbb;"
| 9 || April 5 || @ Indians || 2–3 || Cimber (1–0) || Biagini (0–1) || — || 12,881 || 3–6 || 3½
|-  style="text-align:center; background:#fbb;"
| 10 || April 6 || @ Indians || 2–7 || Carrasco (1–1) || Pannone (0–2) || — || 18,429 || 3–7 || 3½
|-  style="text-align:center; background:#fbb;"
| 11 || April 7 || @ Indians || 1–3 || Clevinger (1–0) || Stroman (0–2) || Hand (4) || 17,264 || 3–8 || 4½
|-  style="text-align:center; background:#bfb;"
| 12 || April 9 || @ Red Sox || 7–5 || Shoemaker (3–0) || Sale (0–3) || Giles (3) || 36,179 || 4–8 || 5
|-  style="text-align:center; background:#fbb;"
| 13 || April 11 || @ Red Sox || 6–7 || Walden (2–0) || Giles (0–1) || — || 36,510 || 4–9 || 6
|-  style="text-align:center; background:#fbb;"
| 14 || April 12 || Rays || 7–11 || Yarbrough (2–1) || Thornton (0–1) || — || 17,326 || 4–10 || 7
|-  style="text-align:center; background:#bfb;"
| 15 || April 13 || Rays || 3–1 || Pannone (1–2) || Roe (0–2)  || Giles (4) || 20,771 || 5–10 || 6
|-  style="text-align:center; background:#fbb;"
| 16 || April 14 || Rays || 4–8 || Kolarek (1–0) || Stroman (0–3) || — || 20,512 || 5–11 || 7
|-  style="text-align:center; background:#bfb;"
| 17 || April 15 || @ Twins || 5–3 || Gaviglio (1–0) || Mejía (0–1) || Biagini (1) || 11,727 || 6–11 || 6½
|-  style="text-align:center; background:#bfb;"
| 18 || April 16 || @ Twins || 6–5 || Sanchez (2–1) || May (1–1) || Giles (5) || 13,365 || 7–11 || 6½
|-  style="text-align:center; background:#fbb;"
| 19 || April 17 || @ Twins || 1–4 || Odorizzi (1–2) || Thornton (0–2) || Parker (4) || 11,465 || 7–12 || 7½
|-  style="text-align:center; background:#bfb;"
| 20 || April 18 || @ Twins || 7–4 || Biagini (1–1) || Pineda (2–1) || Giles (6) || 12,523 || 8–12 || 6½
|-  style="text-align:center; background:#bfb;"
| 21 || April 19 || @ Athletics || 5–1 || Stroman (1–3) || Brooks (2–2) || — || 15,128 || 9–12 || 5½
|-  style="text-align:center; background:#bfb;"
| 22 || April 20 || @ Athletics || 10–1 || Gaviglio (2–0) || Fiers (2–2) || — || 31,140 || 10–12 || 4½
|-  style="text-align:center; background:#bfb;"
| 23 || April 21 || @ Athletics || 5–4 || Hudson (1–1) || Anderson (3–1) || Giles (7) || 16,015 || 11–12 || 3½
|-  style="text-align:center; background:#fbb;"
| 24 || April 23 || Giants || 6–7 || Samardzija (2–1) || Thornton (0–3) || Smith (6) || 20,384 || 11–13 || 5
|-  style="text-align:center; background:#fbb;"
| 25 || April 24 || Giants || 0–4 || Pomeranz (1–2) || Buchholz (0–1) || — || 19,652 || 11–14 || 5
|-  style="text-align:center; background:#bfb;"
| 26 || April 26 || Athletics || 4–2 || Giles (1–1) || Petit (0–1) ||  — || 28,688 || 12–14 || 4½
|-  style="text-align:center; background:#bfb;"
| 27 || April 27 || Athletics || 7–1 || Sanchez (3–1) || Anderson (3–2) || — || 22,254 || 13–14 || 4½
|-  style="text-align:center; background:#bfb;"
| 28 || April 28 || Athletics || 5–4 (11) || Luciano (1–0) || Treinen (1–2) || — || 18,557 || 14–14 || 4½ 
|-  style="text-align:center; background:#fbb;"
| 29 || April 30 || @ Angels || 3–4 || Buttrey (2–1) || Tepera (0–1) || Robles (2) || 38,797 || 14–15 || 5½
|-

|-  style="text-align:center; background:#fbb;"
| 30 || May 1 || @ Angels || 3–6 || Peña (1–1) || Stroman (1–4) || Buttrey (1) || 33,082 || 14–16 || 5
|-  style="text-align:center; background:#fbb;"
| 31 || May 2 || @ Angels || 2–6 || Skaggs (3–2) || Sanchez (3–2) || — || 40,064 || 14–17 || 6
|-  style="text-align:center; background:#bfb;"
| 32 || May 3 || @ Rangers || 1–0 (12) || Hudson (2–1) || Jurado (0–1) || Giles (8) || 26,179 || 15–17 || 6
|-  style="text-align:center; background:#fbb;"
| 33 || May 4 || @ Rangers || 5–8 || Lynn (4–2) || Pannone (1–3) || Kelley (2) || 31,787 || 15–18 || 6
|-  style="text-align:center; background:#fbb;"
| 34 || May 5 || @ Rangers || 2–10 || Dowdy (2–1) || Buchholz (0–2) || — || 30,934 || 15–19 || 6½
|-  style="text-align:center; background:#fbb;"
| 35 || May 6 || Twins || 0–8 || Pérez (5–0) || Stroman (1–5) || — || 12,292 || 15–20 || 7½
|-  style="text-align:center; background:#fbb;"
| 36 || May 7 || Twins || 0–3 || Berríos (6–1) || Sanchez (3–3) || Rogers (4) || 14,039 || 15–21 || 8½
|-  style="text-align:center; background:#fbb;"
| 37 || May 8 || Twins || 1–9 || Gibson (3–1) || Thornton (0–4) || — || 14,372 || 15–22 || 8½
|-  style="text-align:center; background:#bfb;"
| 38 || May 10 || White Sox || 4–3 || Biagini (2–1) || Covey (0–2)  || Giles (9) || 20,402 || 16–22  || 7½
|-  style="text-align:center; background:#fbb;"
| 39 || May 11 || White Sox || 2–7 || Nova (2–3) || Stroman (1–6) || — || 24,563 || 16–23 || 8½
|-  style="text-align:center; background:#fbb;"
| 40 || May 12 || White Sox || 1–5 || Giolito (4–1) || Sanchez (3–4) || — || 24,222 || 16–24 || 8½
|-  style="text-align:center; background:#bfb;"
| 41 || May 14 || @ Giants || 7–3 || Thornton (1–4) || Vincent (0–2) || — || 31,230 || 17–24 || 8½
|-  style="text-align:center; background:#fbb;"
| 42 || May 15 || @ Giants || 3–4 || Melancon (1–0) || Tepera (0–2) || Smith (11) || 31,028 || 17–25 || 9½
|-  style="text-align:center; background:#fbb;"
| 43 || May 16 || @ White Sox || 2–4 || Herrera (1–2) || Law (0–1) || Colomé (9) || 20,119 || 17–26 || 10
|-  style="text-align:center; background:#bfb;"
| 44 || May 17 || @ White Sox || 10–2 || Gaviglio (3–0) || Nova (2–4) || Guerra (1) || 17,078 || 18–26 || 9½
|-  style="text-align:center; background:#fbb;"
| 45 || May 18 || @ White Sox || 1–4 (5) || Giolito (5–1) || Feierabend (0–1) || — || 22,908 || 18–27 || 10
|-  style="text-align:center; background:#bfb;"
| 46 || May 19 || @ White Sox || 5–2 || Hudson (3–1) || Herrera (1–3) || Giles (10) || 18,605 || 19–27 || 9½
|-  style="text-align:center; background:#fbb;"
| 47 || May 20 || Red Sox || 2–12 || Price (2–2) || Jackson (0–1) || — || 26,794 || 19–28 || 10½
|-  style="text-align:center; background:#bfb;"
| 48 || May 21 || Red Sox || 10–3 || Stroman (2–6) || Rodríguez (4–3) || — || 14,407 || 20–28 || 10½
|-  style="text-align:center; background:#fbb;"
| 49 || May 22 || Red Sox || 5–6 (13) || Hembree (1–0) || Cordero (0–1) || — || 18,285 || 20–29 || 11½
|-  style="text-align:center; background:#fbb;"
| 50 || May 23 || Red Sox || 2–8 || Weber (1–0) || Gaviglio (3–1) || — || 36,526 || 20–30 || 12½
|-  style="text-align:center; background:#fbb;"
| 51 || May 24 || Padres || 3–6 || Wisler (2–1) || Hudson (3–2) || Stammen (2) || 19,480 || 20–31 || 13
|-  style="text-align:center; background:#fbb;"
| 52 || May 25 || Padres || 4–19 || Quantrill (1–2) || Jackson (0–2) || — || 24,212 || 20–32 || 14½
|-  style="text-align:center; background:#bfb;"
| 53 || May 26 || Padres || 10–1 || Stroman (3–6) || Erlin (0–1) || — || 24,462 || 21–32 || 13½
|-  style="text-align:center; background:#fbb;"
| 54 || May 27 || @ Rays || 3–8 || Chirinos (6–1) || Sanchez (3–5) || || 15,883 || 21–33 || 14½
|-  style="text-align:center; background:#fbb;"
| 55 || May 28  || @ Rays || 1–3 || Yarbrough (4–1) || Richard (0–1) || Castillo (6) || 5,786 || 21–34 || 14½
|-  style="text-align:center; background:#fbb;"
| 56 || May 29  || @ Rays || 3–4 (11) || Castillo (1–3) || Shafer (0–1) || || 6,166 || 21–35 || 15½
|-  style="text-align:center; background:#fbb;"
| 57 || May 31 || @ Rockies || 6–13 || Márquez (6–2) || Jackson (0–3) || || 32,990 || 21–36 || 16½
|-

|-  style="text-align:center; background:#fbb;"
| 58 || June 1 || @  Rockies || 2–4 || Gray (5–4) || Stroman (3–7) || Oberg (2) || 34,205 || 21–37 || 17½
|-  style="text-align:center; background:#fbb;"
| 59 || June 2 || @ Rockies || 1–5 || Senzatela (4–4) || Sanchez (3–6) || — || 37,861 || 21–38 || 17½
|-  style="text-align:center; background:#bfb;"
| 60 || June 4 || Yankees || 4–3 || Pannone (2–3) || Tanaka (3–5) ||Giles (11) || 20,671 || 22–38 || 16½
|-  style="text-align:center; background:#bfb;"
| 61 || June 5 || Yankees || 11–7 || Gaviglio (4–1) || Britton (2–1) || — || 16,609 || 23–38 || 15½
|-  style="text-align:center; background:#fbb;"
| 62 || June 6 || Yankees || 2–6 || Happ (6–3) || Jackson (0–4) || Chapman (18) || 25,657 || 23–39 || 16½
|-  style="text-align:center; background:#fbb;"
| 63 || June 7 || Diamondbacks || 2–8 || Kelly (6–6) || Stroman (3–8) || — || 16,555 || 23–40 || 16½
|-  style="text-align:center; background:#fbb;"
| 64 || June 8 || Diamondbacks || 0–6 || Greinke (7–2) || Sanchez (3–7) || — || 22,954 || 23–41 || 16½
|-  style="text-align:center; background:#fbb;"
| 65 || June 9 || Diamondbacks || 2–8 || Ray (5–3) || Richard (0–2) || — || 19,661 || 23–42 || 17½
|-  style="text-align:center; background:#fbb;"
| 66 || June 11 || @ Orioles || 2–4 || Means (6–4) || Thornton (1–5) || Givens (6) || 12,524 || 23–43 || 18
|-  style="text-align:center; background:#bfb;"
| 67 || June 12 || @ Orioles || 8–6 || Jackson (1–4)|| Hess (1–9) ||  Hudson (1) || 11,153 || 24–43 || 17½
|-  style="text-align:center; background:#bfb;"
| 68 || June 13 || @ Orioles || 12–3 || Stroman (4–8) || Ynoa (0–3) || — || 14,910 || 25–43 || 16½
|-  style="text-align:center; background:#fbb;"
| 69 || June 14 || @ Astros || 2–15 || Cole (6–5) || Sanchez (3–8) || Armenteros (1) || 34,719 || 25–44 || 17
|-  style="text-align:center; background:#fbb;"
| 70 || June 15 || @ Astros || 2–7 || Valdez (3–2) || Richard (0–3) || — || 38,012 || 25–45 || 17½
|-  style="text-align:center; background:#bfb;"
| 71 || June 16 || @ Astros || 12–0 || Thornton (2–5) || Peacock (6–4) || — || 42,174 || 26–45 || 17½
|-  style="text-align:center; background:#fbb;"
| 72 || June 17 || Angels || 5–10 || Peña (5–1) || Jackson (1–5) || — || 15,227 || 26–46 || 18½
|-  style="text-align:center; background:#fbb;"
| 73 || June 18 || Angels || 1–3 || Skaggs (6–6) || Stroman (4–9) || Robles (11) || 17,259 || 26–47 || 19½
|-  style="text-align:center; background:#fbb;"
| 74 || June 19 || Angels || 6–11 || Ramirez (3–0) || Sanchez (3–9) || — || 16,225 || 26–48 || 20½
|-  style="text-align:center; background:#bfb;"
| 75 || June 20 || Angels || 7–5 (10) || Kingham (2–1) || Buttrey (4–4) || — || 24,291 || 27–48 || 20½
|-  style="text-align:center; background:#fbb;"
| 76 || June 21 || @ Red Sox || 5–7  || Workman (6–1) || Romano (0–1) || — || 36,711 || 27–49 || 21½
|-  style="text-align:center; background:#bfb;"
| 77 || June 22 || @ Red Sox || 8–7 || Kingham (3–1) || Barnes (3–2) || Giles (12) || 36,712 || 28–49 || 21½
|-  style="text-align:center; background:#bfb;"
| 78 || June 23 || @ Red Sox || 6–1 || Stroman (5–9) || Porcello (5–7) || — || 36,495 || 29–49 || 20½
|-  style="text-align:center; background:#fbb;"
| 79 || June 24 || @ Yankees || 8–10 || Sabathia (5–4) || Sanchez (3–10) || Chapman (22) || 37,204 || 29–50 || 21½
|-  style="text-align:center; background:#fbb;"
| 80 || June 25 || @ Yankees || 3–4 || Green (2–2) || Richard (0–4) || Chapman (23) || 40,119 || 29–51 || 22½
|-  style="text-align:center; background:#fbb;"
| 81 || June 26 || @ Yankees || 7–8 || Britton (3–1) || Kingham (3–2) || — || 40,578 || 29–52 || 23½
|-  style="text-align:center; background:#bfb;"
| 82 || June 28 || Royals || 6–2 || Hudson (4–2) || Duffy (3–4) || — || 18,399 || 30–52 || 23
|-  style="text-align:center; background:#bfb;"
| 83 || June 29 || Royals || 7–5 || Hudson (5–2) || Barlow (2–3) || — || 24,906 || 31–52 || 23
|-  style="text-align:center; background:#fbb;"
| 84 || June 30 || Royals || 6–7 || Keller (4–9) || Sanchez (3–11) || Kennedy (11) || 21,727 || 31–53 || 24
|-

|-  style="text-align:center; background:#bfb;"
| 85 || July 1 || Royals || 11–4 || Richard (1–4) || Sparkman (2–4) || — || 29,339 || 32–53 || 23½
|-  style="text-align:center; background:#fbb;"
| 86 || July 2 || Red Sox || 6–10 || Price (6–2) || Thornton (2–6) || — || 18,415 || 32–54 || 23½
|-  style="text-align:center; background:#bfb;"
| 87 || July 3 || Red Sox || 6–3 || Waguespack (1–0) || Sale (3–8) || Giles (13) || 16,883 || 33–54 || 23½
|-  style="text-align:center; background:#fbb;"
| 88 || July 4 || Red Sox || 7–8 || Workman (8–1) || Giles (1–2) || — || 22,217 || 33–55 || 24½
|-  style="text-align:center; background:#fbb;"
| 89 || July 5 || Orioles || 1–4 || Bundy (4–10) || Sanchez (3–12) || Fry (3) || 20,530 || 33–56 || 25½
|-  style="text-align:center; background:#fbb;"
| 90 || July 6 || Orioles || 1–8 || Cashner (9–3) || Richard (1–5) || — || 22,405 || 33–57 || 25½
|-  style="text-align:center; background:#bfb;"
| 91 || July 7 || Orioles || 6–1 || Thornton (3–6) || Wojciechowski (0–2) || — || 22,487 || 34–57 || 24½
|-  style="text-align:center; background:#fbb;"
| 92 || July 12 || @ Yankees || 0–4 || Germán (11–2) || Sanchez (3–13) || — || 47,162 || 34–58 || 25½
|-  style="text-align:center; background:#bfb;"
| 93 || July 13 || @ Yankees || 2–1 || Biagini (3–1) || Happ (7–5) || Hudson (2) || 43,472 || 35–58 || 24½
|-  style="text-align:center; background:#fbb;"
| 94 || July 14 || @ Yankees || 2–4 || Tanaka (6–5) || Stroman (5–10) || Chapman (25) || 42,303 || 35–59 || 25½
|-  style="text-align:center; background:#fbb;"
| 95 || July 15 || @ Red Sox || 8–10 || Porcello (7–7) || Thornton (3–7) || Workman (4) || 35,616 || 35–60 || 25½
|-  style="text-align:center; background:#bfb;"
| 96 || July 16 || @ Red Sox || 10–4 || Shafer (1–1) || Cashner (9–4) || — || 36,341 || 36–60 || 25½
|-  style="text-align:center; background:#fbb;"
| 97 || July 17 || @ Red Sox || 4–5 || Rodríguez (11–4) || Sanchez (3–14) || Workman (5) || 34,853 || 36–61 || 26
|-  style="text-align:center; background:#fbb;"
| 98 || July 18 || @ Red Sox || 0–5 || Sale (4–9) || Pannone (2–4) || — || 35,357 || 36–62 || 27½
|-  style="text-align:center; background:#bfb;"
| 99 || July 19 || @ Tigers || 12–1 || Stroman (6–10) || Zimmermann (0–7) || — || 26,498 || 37–62 || 27½
|-  style="text-align:center; background:#bfb;"
| 100 || July 20 || @ Tigers || 7–5 || Font (3–2) || Soto (0–4) || Giles (14) || 28,784 || 38–62 || 27½
|-  style="text-align:center; background:#fbb;"
| 101 || July 21 || @ Tigers || 3–4 (10) || Ramirez (5–3) || Mayza (0–1) || || 22,562 || 38–63 || 27½ 
|-  style="text-align:center; background:#fbb;"
| 102 || July 22 || Indians || 3–7 || Clevinger (4–2) || Borucki (0–1) || — ||  22,295 || 38–64 || 27½
|-  style="text-align:center; background:#bfb;"
| 103 || July 23 || Indians || 2–1 (10)  || Giles (2–2) || Olson (1–1) || — || 22,186 || 39–64 || 27½
|-  style="text-align:center; background:#fbb;"
| 104 || July 24 || Indians || 0–4 || Bieber (10–3) || Stroman (6–11) || — || 25,385 || 39–65 || 28½
|-  style="text-align:center; background:#fbb;"
| 105 || July 26 || Rays || 1–3 || Yarbrough (9–3) || Waguespack (1–1) || Poche (1) || 22,767 || 39–66 || 28
|-  style="text-align:center; background:#bfb;"
| 106 || July 27 || Rays || 10–9 (12) || Hudson (6–2) || Pagán (2–2) || — || 28,204 || 40–66 || 27
|-  style="text-align:center; background:#fbb;"
| 107 || July 28 || Rays || 9–10 || Roe (1–3) || Hudson (6–3) || Castillo (8) || 24,542 || 40–67 || 28 
|-  style="text-align:center; background:#bfb;"
| 108 || July 29 || @ Royals || 7–3 || Mayza (1–1) || Keller (7–10) || — || 18,306 || 41–67 || 27½
|-  style="text-align:center; background:#bfb;"
| 109 || July 30 || @ Royals || 9–2 || Reid-Foley (1–1) || Montgomery (1–4) || — || 18,379 || 42–67 || 26½
|-  style="text-align:center; background:#bfb;"
| 110 || July 31 || @ Royals || 4–1 || Waguespack (2–1) || Junis (6–10) || Shafer (1) || 14,480 || 43–67 || 26½
|-

|-  style="text-align:center; background:#bfb;"
| 111 || August 1 || @ Orioles || 11–2 || Thornton (4–7) || Wojciechowski (2–4) || — || 9,716 || 44–67 || 26
|-  style="text-align:center; background:#bfb;"
| 112 || August 2 || @ Orioles || 5–2 || Kingham (4–2) || Brooks (2–5) || Law (1) || 16,331 || 45–67 || 26
|-  style="text-align:center; background:#fbb;"
| 113 || August 3 || @ Orioles || 4–6 || Givens (2–5) || Boshers (0–1)  || Fry (3) || 12,951 || 45–68 || 27½
|-  style="text-align:center; background:#fbb;"
| 114 || August 4 || @ Orioles || 5–6 || Eshelman (1–2)|| Reid-Foley (1–2) || Armstrong (4) || 18,837 || 45–69 || 28½
|-  style="text-align:center; background:#bfb;"
| 115 || August 5 || @ Rays || 2–0 || Waguespack (3–1) || Morton (12–4) || Law (2) || 11,948 || 46–69 || 28½
|-  style="text-align:center; background:#fbb;"
| 116 || August 6 || @ Rays || 6–7  || Castillo (2–6) || Boshers (0–2) || — || 9,434 || 46–70 || 29½
|-  style="text-align:center; background:#bfb;"
| 117 || August 7 || @ Rays || 4–3 || Stewart (1–0) || McKay (2–2) || Giles (15) || 10,299 || 47–70 || 29½
|-  style="text-align:center; background:#fbb;"
| 118 || August 8 || Yankees || 6–12 || Germán (15–2) || Pannone (2–5) || Cessa (1) || 34,108 || 47–71 || 30½
|-  style="text-align:center; background:#bfb;"
| 119 || August 9 || Yankees || 8–2 || Reid-Foley (2–2) || Happ (9–7) || — || 25,782 || 48–71 || 29½
|-  style="text-align:center; background:#bfb;"
| 120 || August 10 || Yankees || 5–4 || Adam (1–0) || Ottavino (5–4) || Law (3) || 33,903 || 49–71 || 28½
|-  style="text-align:center; background:#fbb;"
| 121 || August 11 || Yankees || 0–1 || Tanaka (8–6) || Thornton (4–8) || Chapman (31) ||  27,790 || 49–72 || 29½
|-  style="text-align:center; background:#bfb;" 
| 122 || August 12 || Rangers || 19–4 || Stewart (2–0) || Jurado (6–8) || — || 16,492 || 50–72 || 30
|-  style="text-align:center; background:#bfb;"
| 123 || August 13 || Rangers || 3–0 || Pannone (3–5) || Lynn (14–8) || Giles (16) || 22,958 || 51–72 || 30
|-  style="text-align:center; background:#fbb;"
| 124 || August 14 || Rangers || 3–7 || Allard (1–0) || Reid-Foley  (2–3) || — ||34,666
| 51–73 || 31 
|-  style="text-align:center; background:#bfb;"
| 125 || August 16 || Mariners || 7–3 || Waguespack (4–1) || LeBlanc (6–7) || — || 20,844 || 52–73 || 30½
|-  style="text-align:center; background:#fbb;"
| 126 || August 17 || Mariners || 3–4 || Bass (2–4) || Mayza (1–2) || Magill (1) || 22,073 || 52–74 || 31½
|-  style="text-align:center; background:#fbb;"
| 127 || August 18 || Mariners || 0–7 || Kikuchi (5–8) || Font (3–3) || — || 23,604 || 52–75 || 31½
|-  style="text-align:center; background:#fbb;"
| 128 || August 20 || @ Dodgers || 3–16 || Kershaw (13–2) || Reid-Foley (2–4) || — || 52,030 ||52–76 || 31½ 
|-  style="text-align:center; background:#fbb;"
| 129 || August 21 || @ Dodgers || 1–2  || Báez (7–2) || Mayza (1–3) || — || 44,106 || 52–77 || 31½
|-  style="text-align:center; background:#fbb;"
| 130 || August 22 || @ Dodgers || 2–3 || Sadler (3–0) || Law (0–2) || — || 49,796 || 52–78 || 31½
|-  style="text-align:center; background:#fbb;"
| 131 || August 23 || @ Mariners || 4–7 || Wisler (3–2) || Gaviglio (4–2) || Magill (3) || 34,706 || 52–79 || 32½
|-  style="text-align:center; background:#bfb;"
| 132 || August 24 || @ Mariners || 7–5 || Stewart (3–0) || McClain (0–1) || Law (4) || 34,590 || 53–79 || 31½
|-  style="text-align:center; background:#fbb;"
| 133 || August 25 || @ Mariners || 1–3 || Gonzales (14–10) || Buchholz (0–3) || Magill (4) || 29,698 || 53–80 || 32½
|-  style="text-align:center; background:#bfb;"
| 134 || August 27 || Braves || 3–1 || Godley (4–5) || Soroka (10–3) || Giles (17) || 24,578 || 54–80 || 33
|-  style="text-align:center; background:#fbb;"
| 135 || August 28 || Braves || 4–9 || Jackson (8–2) || Waguespack (4–2) || — || 23,112 || 54–81 || 34
|-  style="text-align:center; background:#fbb;"
| 136 || August 30 || Astros || 4–7 || McHugh (4–5) || Thornton (4–9) || — || 25,289 || 54–82 || 34
|-  style="text-align:center; background:#bfb;"
| 137 || August 31 || Astros || 6–4 || Buchholz (1–3) || Valdez (4–7) || Giles (18) || 26,414 || 55–82 || 34
|-

|-  style="text-align:center; background:#fbb;"
| 138 || September 1 || Astros || 0–2 || Verlander (17–5) || Giles (2–3) || — || 24,104 || 55–83 || 35
|-  style="text-align:center; background:#fbb;"
| 139 || September 2 || @ Braves || 3–6 || Soroka (11–3) || Waguespack (4–3) || Melancon (9) || 28,987 || 55–84 || 35
|-  style="text-align:center; background:#fbb;"
| 140 || September 3 || @ Braves || 2–7 || Foltynewicz (5-5) || Font (3–4) || — || 25,427 || 55–85 || 36
|-  style="text-align:center; background:#fbb;"
| 141 || September 5 || @ Rays || 4–6 || Drake (4–2) || Boshers (0–3) || Pagán (18) || 5,962 || 55–86 || 37
|-  style="text-align:center; background:#fbb;"
| 142 || September 6 || @ Rays || 0–5 || Fairbanks (1–2) || Buchholz (1–4) || Pagán (19) || 10,853 || 55–87 || 37
|-  style="text-align:center; background:#fbb;"
| 143 || September 7 || @ Rays || 3–5 || Anderson (5–4) || Romano (0–2) || Drake (2) || 12,663 || 55–88 || 38
|-  style="text-align:center; background:#fbb;"
| 144 || September 8 || @ Rays || 3–8 || Richards (5–12) || Waguespack (4–4) || — || 14,071 || 55–89 || 39
|-  style="text-align:center; background:#bfb;"
| 145 || September 10 || Red Sox || 4–3 || Shafer (2–1) || Taylor (1–2) || Giles (19) || 17,819 || 56–89 || 38½
|-  style="text-align:center; background:#bfb;"
| 146 || September 11 || Red Sox || 8–0 || Thornton (5–9) || Kelley (0–1) || — || 14,463 || 57–89 || 38
|-  style="text-align:center; background:#fbb;"
| 147 || September 12 || Red Sox || 4–7 || Taylor (2–2) || Buchholz (1–5) || Workman (12) || 17,420 || 57–90 || 39½
|-  style="text-align:center; background:#bfb;"
| 148 || September 13 || Yankees || 6–5   || Font (4–4) || Lyons (1–2) || — || 23,915 || 58–90 || 38½
|-  style="text-align:center; background:#fbb;"
| 149 || September 14 || Yankees || 3–13 || Paxton (14–6) || Waguespack (4–5) || — || 26,308 || 58–91 || 39½
|-  style="text-align:center; background:#bfb;"
| 150 || September 15 || Yankees || 6–4 || Zeuch (1–0) || Cortés Jr. (5–1) || Giles (20) || 22,562 || 59–91 || 38½
|-  style="text-align:center; background:#bfb;"
| 151 || September 17 || @ Orioles || 8–5 || Law (1–2) || Givens (2–6) || — || 9,280 || 60–91 || 38½
|-  style="text-align:center; background:#bfb;"
| 152 || September 18 || @ Orioles || 11–10 || Stewart (4–0) || Castro (1–3) || Law (5) || 9,066 || 61–91 || 37½
|-  style="text-align:center; background:#bfb;"
| 153 || September 19 || @ Orioles || 8–4 || Kay (1–0) || Ynoa (1–9) || — || 10,148 || 62–91 || 37½
|-  style="text-align:center; background:#bfb;"
| 154 || September 20 || @ Yankees || 4–3 || Adam (2–0) || Kahnle (3–2) || Giles (21) || 45,270 || 63–91 || 36½
|-  style="text-align:center; background:#fbb;"
| 155 || September 21 || @ Yankees || 2–7 || Paxton (15–6) || Zeuch (1–1) || — || 43,602 || 63–92 || 37½
|-  style="text-align:center; background:#fbb;"
| 156 || September 22 || @ Yankees || 3–8 || Severino (1–0) || Font (4–5) || — || 44,583 || 63–93 || 38½
|-  style="text-align:center; background:#bfb;"
| 157 || September 23 || Orioles || 11–10  || Adam (3–0) || Eades (0–1)|| — || 13,193 || 64–93 || 38
|-  style="text-align:center; background:#fbb;"
| 158 || September 24 || Orioles || 4–11 || Bundy (7–14) || Pannone (3–6) || — || 12,625 || 64–94 || 38
|-  style="text-align:center; background:#bfb;"
| 159 || September 25 || Orioles || 3–2 || Waguespack (5–5) || Ynoa (1–10) || Giles (22) || 13,853 || 65–94 || 37
|-  style="text-align:center; background:#fbb;"
| 160 || September 27 || Rays || 2–6 || Drake (5–2) || Zeuch (1–2) || — || 16,348 || 65–95 || 38
|-  style="text-align:center; background:#bfb;"
| 161 || September 28 || Rays || 4–1 || Thornton (6–9) || Yarbrough (11–6) || Giles (23) || 20,293 || 66–95 || 37
|-  style="text-align:center; background:#bfb;"
| 162 || September 29 || Rays || 8–3 || Buchholz (2–5) || Snell (6–8) || — || 25,738 || 67–95 || 36
|-

Roster

Statistics

Batting
Note: G = Games played; AB = At bats; R = Runs scored; H = Hits; 2B = Doubles; 3B = Triples; HR = Home runs; RBI = Runs batted in; SB = Stolen bases; BB =  Walks; AVG = Batting average; Ref. = Reference

Pitching
Note: G = Games pitched; GS = Games started; W = Wins; L = Losses; SV = Saves; ERA = Earned run average; WHIP = Walks plus hits per inning pitched; IP = Innings pitched; H = Hits allowed; R = Total runs allowed; ER = Earned runs allowed; W = Walks allowed; K = Strikeouts; Ref. = Reference

Transactions

March
 On March 28, placed Ryan Borucki, Clay Buchholz, Jonathan Davis, David Phelps, and Ryan Tepera on the 10-day injured list, recalled Rowdy Tellez, and selected the contract of Javy Guerra.

April
 On April 1, placed Clayton Richard on the 10-day injured list, and recalled Sean Reid-Foley.
 On April 2, transferred Dalton Pompey to the 60-day injured list, recalled Anthony Alford, acquired Alen Hanson, Derek Law, and Juan De Paula from the San Francisco Giants for Kevin Pillar, and acquired Socrates Brito from the San Diego Padres for Rodrigo Orozco.
 On April 4, optioned Anthony Alford and Sean Reid-Foley, and recalled Socrates Brito and Alen Hanson.
 On April 7, sent Clay Buchholz on a rehab assignment to the Triple-A Buffalo Bisons.
 On April 12, sent Ryan Tepera on a rehab assignment to the Triple-A Buffalo Bisons.
 On April 13, optioned Richard Ureña and activated Clay Buchholz.
 On April 15, transferred Ryan Borucki to the 60-day injured list, optioned Lourdes Gurriel Jr., and selected the contract of Eric Sogard.
 On April 18, designated Javy Guerra for assignment and activated Ryan Tepera.
 On April 21, placed Matt Shoemaker on the 10-day injured list and recalled Richard Ureña.
 On April 22, outrighted Javy Guerra to Triple-A Buffalo.
 On April 26, optioned Richard Ureña and selected the contract of Vladimir Guerrero Jr.

May
 On May 3, designated Alen Hanson for assignment and selected the contract of Derek Law.
 On May 7, outrighted Alen Hanson to Triple-A Buffalo.
 On May 9, optioned Thomas Pannone.
 On May 10, placed Clay Buchholz on the 10-day injured list, designated Socrates Brito for assignment, recalled Jonathan Davis and Thomas Pannone, and selected the contract of Javy Guerra.
 On May 15, transferred David Phelps and Matt Shoemaker to the 60-day injured list, optioned Thomas Pannone, selected the contract of Edwin Jackson, and claimed Jimmy Cordero off waivers from the Washington Nationals.
 On May 16, outrighted Socrates Brito, optioned Teoscar Hernandez, and recalled Richard Ureña.
 On May 18, sent Clayton Richard on a rehab assignment to the Triple-A Buffalo Bisons, designated Javy Guerra for assignment, and selected the contract of Ryan Feierabend.
 On May 21, placed Ryan Tepera on the 10-day injured list and recalled Jimmy Cordero.
 On May 23, optioned Jimmy Cordero and activated Clayton Richard. Later, designated Jimmy Cordero for assignment and claimed Zac Rosscup off waivers from the Seattle Mariners.
 On May 24, placed Elvis Luciano on the bereavement list, designated Ryan Feierabend for assignment, optioned Billy McKinney and Richard Ureña, recalled Thomas Pannone and Lourdes Gurriel Jr., and selected the contract of Cavan Biggio.
 On May 26, placed Tim Mayza on the 10-day injured list, outrighted Ryan Feierabend to Triple-A Buffalo, and recalled Jacob Waguespack.
 On May 28, designated Zac Rosscup for assignment and selected the contract of Justin Shafer.
 On May 29, placed Jacob Waguespack on the 10-day injured list and activated Elvis Luciano.

June
 On June 1, outrighted Zac Rosscup to Triple-A Buffalo.
 On June 3, optioned Justin Shafer.
 On June 4, activated Tim Mayza.
 On June 5, optioned Jonathan Davis, recalled Teoscar Hernández, and sent David Phelps on a rehab assignment to the Advanced-A Dunedin Blue Jays.
 On June 12, placed Ken Giles on the 10-day injured list, transferred Clay Buchholz to the 60-day injured list, and selected the contract of Jordan Romano.
 On June 13, placed Elvis Luciano on the 10-day injured list, transferred Ryan Tepera to the 60-day injured list, recalled Justin Shafer, and acquired Nick Kingham from the Pittsburgh Pirates for cash considerations.
 On June 15, optioned Thomas Pannone and activated Nick Kingham.
 On June 16, sent Jacob Waguespack on a rehab assignment to the Triple-A Buffalo Bisons.
 On June 17, optioned Justin Shafer, transferred Elvis Luciano to the 60-day injured list, and activated David Phelps.
 On June 18, placed Edwin Jackson and Justin Smoak on the 10-day injured list, and recalled Billy McKinney and Justin Shafer.
 On June 20, optioned Justin Shafer and activated Ken Giles.
 On June 23, optioned Jordan Romano and recalled Sean Reid-Foley.
 On June 26, sent Ryan Borucki on a rehab assignment to the Rookie-level Gulf Coast League Blue Jays.
 On June 28, optioned Billy McKinney and activated Justin Smoak.

July
 On July 1, sent Ryan Borucki on a rehab assignment to the Dunedin Blue Jays.
 On July 2, sent Edwin Jackson on a rehab assignment to the Triple-A Buffalo Bisons.
 On July 3, sent Dalton Pompey on a rehab assignment to the Rookie-level Gulf Coast League Blue Jays, and optioned Sean Reid-Foley.
 On July 4, optioned Jacob Waguespack, and recalled Thomas Pannone.
 On July 5, optioned Thomas Pannone, and recalled Jonathan Davis.
 On July 7, optioned Jonathan Davis, and recalled Justin Shafer.
 On July 8, sent Dalton Pompey on a rehab assignment to the Advanced-A Dunedin Blue Jays.
 On July 11, sent Ryan Borucki on a rehab assignment to the Triple-A Buffalo Bisons.
 On July 14, placed Clayton Richard on the 10-day injured list, and activated Edwin Jackson.
 On July 15, sent Dalton Pompey on a rehab assignment to the Triple-A Buffalo Bisons, optioned Rowdy Tellez, and recalled Billy McKinney.
 On July 16, designated Edwin Jackson for assignment, and recalled Jacob Waguespack.
 On July 17, acquired Wilmer Font from the New York Mets for cash considerations.
 On July 18, designated Nick Kingham for assignment, and recalled Thomas Pannone.
 On July 19, optioned Thomas Pannone, and activated Wilmer Font.
 On July 21, outrighted Nick Kingham to the Triple-A Buffalo Bisons.
 On July 22, placed Trent Thornton on the 10-day injured list, and activated Ryan Borucki and Dalton Pompey. Pompey was later designated for assignment.
 On July 27, placed Luke Maile on the 10-day injured list, and recalled Reese McGuire.
 On July 28, acquired two players to be named later from the Tampa Bay Rays for Eric Sogard, and acquired Anthony Kay and Simeon Woods Richardson from the New York Mets for Marcus Stroman and cash considerations.
 On July 29, selected the contract of Bo Bichette, and recalled Thomas Pannone.
 On July 30, outrighted Dalton Pompey to the Triple-A Buffalo Bisons, acquired Thomas Hatch from the Chicago Cubs for David Phelps and cash considerations, and recalled Sean Reid-Foley.
 On July 31, placed Ryan Borucki on the 10-day injured list, claimed Brock Stewart off waivers from the Los Angeles Dodgers and optioned him to Triple-A, acquired Derek Fisher from the Houston Astros for Aaron Sanchez, Cal Stevenson, and Joe Biagini, acquired Kyle Johnston from the Washington Nationals for Daniel Hudson, and selected the contract of Buddy Boshers from the Triple-A Buffalo Bisons.

August
 On August 1, activated Trent Thornton, and selected the contract of Jason Adam.
 On August 2, optioned Billy McKinney and selected the contract of Nick Kingham.
 On August 3, placed Nick Kingham on the 10-day injured list, and recalled Yennsy Díaz.
 On August 5, optioned Yennsy Díaz, and recalled Brock Stewart.
 On August 7, designated David Paulino for assignment, and claimed Zack Godley off waivers from the Arizona Diamondbacks.
 On August 8, optioned Brock Stewart and activated Zack Godley.
 On August 9, sent Clay Buchholz on a rehab assignment to the Rookie-level Gulf Coast League Blue Jays.
 On August 10, placed Lourdes Gurriel Jr. on the 10-day injured list and recalled Brock Stewart.
 On August 11, optioned Jason Adam, selected the contract of Neil Ramírez and transferred Ryan Borucki to the 60-day injured list.
 On August 12, recalled Billy McKinney.
 On August 13, optioned Brock Stewart, and recalled Rowdy Tellez.
 On August 16, claimed Beau Taylor off waivers from the Oakland Athletics and optioned him.
 On August 17, sent Ryan Tepera on a rehab assignment to the Advanced-A Dunedin Blue Jays.
 On August 18, sent Clay Buchholz on a rehab assignment to the Advanced-A Dunedin Blue Jays.
 On August 20, optioned Thomas Pannone, and recalled Richard Ureña.
 On August 21, optioned Sean Reid-Foley, and recalled Jason Adam.
 On August 22, placed Ken Giles on the paternity list, and recalled Jordan Romano.
 On August 23, sent Ryan Tepera on a rehab assignment to the Triple-A Buffalo Bisons.
 On August 24, optioned Richard Ureña, and recalled Brock Stewart.
 On August 25, activated Clay Buchholz and Ken Giles, designated Nick Kingham for assignment, and optioned Justin Shafer and Brock Stewart.
 On August 31, sent Clayton Richard on a rehab assignment to the Triple-A Buffalo Bisons.

September
 On September 1, designated Neil Ramírez for assignment, activated Ryan Tepera, acquired Curtis Taylor and Edisson Gonzalez from the Tampa Bay Rays, and recalled Beau Taylor.
 On September 2, activated Clayton Richard and recalled Thomas Pannone.
 On September 3, recalled Anthony Alford, Jonathan Davis and Richard Ureña, selected the contract of T.J. Zeuch, designated Zack Godley for assignment, and outrighted Neil Ramírez to the Triple-A Buffalo Bisons.
 On September 5, recalled Brock Stewart and Justin Shafer.
 On September 6, outrighted Zack Godley to the Triple-A Buffalo Bisons.
 On September 7, designated Beau Taylor for assignment and selected the contract of Anthony Kay.
 On September 12, activated Elvis Luciano and released Clayton Richard.
 On September 14, activated Lourdes Gurriel Jr. and Luke Maile.
 On September 18, placed Tim Mayza on the 60-day injured list, and claimed Ryan Dull off waivers from the New York Yankees.
 On September 20, designated Ryan Dull for assignment, and claimed Breyvic Valera off waivers from the New York Yankees.
 On September 24, outrighted Ryan Dull to the Triple-A Buffalo Bisons.
 On September 25, placed Lourdes Gurriel Jr. on the 60-day injured list, selected the contract of Ryan Dull, and recalled Yennsy Díaz.
 On September 30, recalled Sein Reid-Foley, Héctor Pérez, Patrick Murphy and Julian Merryweather.

Farm system

Notes

References

Toronto Blue Jays seasons
Toronto Blue Jays
Toronto Blue Jays
Toronto Blue Jays

External links
2019 Toronto Blue Jays at Baseball Reference